The Hitachi Ha-51 (unified designation), was a Japanese air-cooled twenty-two-cylinder twin-row radial aircraft engine designed by Hitachi during the final years of World War II. In August 1945, development was halted. The engine had yet to find an application and bombing had destroyed the factory where production was to take place.

Design
Two companies responded, Nakajima and Hitachi. The Hitachi engine was designed at the company’s engine plant in Tachikawa.

The resulting Hitachi design was one of the first aircraft engines with twenty cylinders developed anywhere in the world. The engine had a steel crankcase, with an aluminium head mounted on steel cylinders each of bore  and stroke , similar to the eighteen-cylinder Nakajima Homare, but angled at 60° rather than 78° to accommodate the additional four cylinders.

Five engines were ordered and three built. The first ran in 1944. One prototype engine was built and ran for 100 hours on test. The engine reported very high oil consumption, up to 20g/kW⋅h, which was attributed to the rigidity of the crankcase.

The factory was bombed on 24 April 1945 and the programme was halted. The Japanese Army did not have a aircraft available that needed the engine and development had taken substantial resources and these were to redirected to producing engines that had a more immediate need.

Surviving engines
A single example found at Haneda is on display at the museum next to Narita airport.

Specification

See also

References

Citations

Bibliography

 

1940s aircraft piston engines
Aircraft air-cooled radial piston engines
Hitachi